The Pahsimeroi River is a  river in Idaho in the United States. It is a tributary of the Salmon River, which in turn is tributary to the Snake River and Columbia River.

Course
From its source in Custer County, at the confluence of the West Fork and East Fork headwaters, the Pahsimeroi River flows generally northwest, through the Pahsimeroi Valley, between the Lemhi Range to the east, and the Lost River Range and to the west.

The Pahsimeroi River joins the Salmon River near Ellis, Idaho, upriver from Salmon, Idaho.

River modification
The water of the Pahsimeroi River and its tributaries is used for irrigation agriculture. All of the river's mainstem tributaries are wholly diverted and totally disconnected year round due to diversion for irrigation.

See also
 List of rivers in Idaho
 List of longest streams of Idaho

References

Rivers of Idaho
Rivers of Lemhi County, Idaho
Rivers of Custer County, Idaho
Tributaries of the Salmon River (Idaho)